Pilar Buepoyo Boseka is an Equatoguinean politician. She is a member of the Pan-African Parliament for Equatorial Guinea. She was the Vice-Minister of  Health and Environment from 1999-2001.

References

Year of birth missing (living people)
Living people
Members of the Pan-African Parliament from Equatorial Guinea
Government ministers of Equatorial Guinea
20th-century women politicians
21st-century women politicians
Women government ministers of Equatorial Guinea
Women members of the Pan-African Parliament